Wojciech Mojzesowicz (born 25 June 1954) is a Polish politician.  He joined Poland Comes First when that party split from Law and Justice in 2010.

He was a Member of Sejm (1989–91; 1991–93, 2001–05). He was re-elected to the Sejm on 25 September 2005, receiving 12601 votes in Bydgoszcz as a candidate for Law and Justice. Since 31 July 2007, he has been Minister of Agriculture and Rural Development, succeeding Andrzej Lepper.

See also
Members of Polish Sejm 2005-2007

External links
Wojciech Mojzesowicz - parliamentary page - includes declarations of interest, voting record, and transcripts of speeches.

1954 births
Living people
Politicians from Bydgoszcz
Members of the Polish Sejm 2005–2007
Members of the Polish Sejm 1991–1993
Members of the Polish Sejm 2001–2005
Poland Comes First politicians
Law and Justice politicians
Agriculture ministers of Poland
Members of the Polish Sejm 2007–2011